DMM may refer to:

Businesses
 DMM Corporation (Digital Media Mart), a Japanese company which sold video games including eroge
DMM.com, its later incarnation
DMM Wales, a Welsh manufacturer of rock-climbing equipment

Science and technology
 Digital multimeter, a multi-functional electronic measuring instrument
 Digital Molecular Matter, a computer game physics engine developed by Pixelux
 Direct metal mastering, a vinyl record manufacturing technology by Teldec
 Disease Models & Mechanisms, a journal by the Company of Biologists
 Dynamic-maturational model of attachment and adaptation, a transdisciplinary model describing relationship dynamics and attachment theory

Other uses
 Daniel Martin Moore, American singer
 Domestic Mail Manual, a U.S. Postal Service guide
 King Fahd International Airport (IATA code: DMM), Dammam, Saudi Arabia
 Project DMM, a Japanese music group whose work is used on TV shows